Parliamentary elections were held in Yugoslavia on 26 March 1950. They were the first held under undisguised Communist rule. The Communist Party of Yugoslavia had won the 1945 elections after an opposition boycott; soon afterward, the Communists abolished the monarchy and declared Yugoslavia a republic. The People's Front, dominated by the Communist Party, was the only organisation to contest the election, receiving 94.2% of the vote.

Background
A new electoral law was passed in January 1950. Imro Filacović of the Croatian Peasant Party was the only MP to vote against the law, complaining that it did not allow opposition parties to oversee the vote counting process. As a result, he was jeered in the National Assembly.

The new law allowed individual candidacies in elections to the National Assembly, replacing the previous closed list system, although the closed list system remained in place for the Council of Nationalities. Candidates required the signatures of 100 registered voters in order to be able to run for office. However, by this time, the ruling People's Front no longer tolerated opposition parties. As a result, only a single People's Front candidate stood in each constituency. Prime Minister Josip Broz Tito  claimed that any alternative programme would be hostile to socialism, and "this, naturally, we cannot allow".

As there were no opposition candidates, voters had the choice of voting for the People's Front or casting a negative vote. Voting was carried out using rubber balls, with voters having to place their hands in both ballot boxes to ensure secrecy.

References

1950 in Yugoslavia
Yugoslavia
Elections in Yugoslavia
One-party elections
Single-candidate elections
March 1950 events in Europe
Election and referendum articles with incomplete results